Yelling Settlement is an unincorporated community in Baldwin County, Alabama, United States.

References

Unincorporated communities in Baldwin County, Alabama
Unincorporated communities in Alabama